Coleman Mellett (May 27, 1974 – February 12, 2009) was an American jazz guitarist in Chuck Mangione's band. He had been scheduled to play with Mangione and the Buffalo Philharmonic Orchestra on February 13, 2009, but was killed the night before in the crash of Colgan Air Flight 3407 with band member Gerry Niewood.

Mellett lived in East Brunswick Township, New Jersey, with his wife, jazz singer Jeanie Bryson, daughter of Dizzy Gillespie.

Mellett joined Mangione's band in 1999.

A documentary about the artist won Best Documentary Film at the 2019 New Jersey International Film Festival.

References

External links
Coleman Mellett at Allmusic
Sing You a Brand New Song: The Words and Music of Coleman Mellett - Documentary Film

1974 births
2009 deaths
Accidental deaths in New York (state)
American jazz guitarists
People from East Brunswick, New Jersey
Victims of aviation accidents or incidents in the United States
20th-century American guitarists
21st-century American guitarists
Guitarists from New Jersey
American male guitarists
20th-century American male musicians
21st-century American male musicians
American male jazz musicians